The .280 Jeffery, also known as the .280 Jeffery Rimless Nitro Express and the .33/280 Jeffery, is a rimless bottleneck centerfire rifle cartridge developed by W.J. Jeffery & Co and introduced in 1913.

Overview
The cartridge was created by Jeffery by necking down their successful .333 Jeffery to .288 inches. The .280 Jeffery's performance is comparable to the .280 Ross, the cartridge is larger than the Ross with greater capacity, but it is typically not loaded for greater velocities.

The .280 Jeffery fires a 140 gr projectile at 3000 fps.

See also
Nitro Express
List of rifle cartridges
7mm rifle cartridges

References

External links
 Cartridgecollector, ".280 Jeffery Rimless Nitro Express (33/280)", cartridgecollector.net, retrieved 16 December 2016.
 The Spanish Association of Cartridge Collectors, ".280 Jeffery rimless N.E.", municion.org , retrieved 3 February 2018.

Pistol and rifle cartridges
British firearm cartridges
W.J. Jeffery & Co cartridges